Libero (English: "Free"), known also as Libero Quotidiano, is an Italian newspaper published in Milan, Italy.

History and profile
Libero was first published in July 2000. The founder is the journalist Vittorio Feltri. The owner and publisher of the paper is Editoriale Libero S.r.l.

Libero has a centre-right and liberal stance.

In February 2007 some members of the New Red Brigades were arrested on a charge of wanting to fire-bomb the Libero editorial offices in Milan. The paper has been edited by Maurizio Belpietro since August 2009.

Circulation
Libero has higher circulation in Lombardy. The 2008 circulation of the paper was 125,215 copies. The paper had a circulation of 113,628 copies in 2009 and 105,123 copies in 2010.

References

External links
 Official website

2000 establishments in Italy
Italian-language newspapers
Newspapers published in Milan
Newspapers established in 2000
Conservatism in Italy
Daily newspapers published in Italy